Mauro Marchano (born 15 January 1980 in Rosario) is an Argentine footballer. He plays as a striker. He also played for Italian Lega Pro Seconda Divisione team Manfredonia. He also represented his native country at the 1997 FIFA U-17 World Championship.

On September 13, 2009 his 30-year-old wife and 11-month son were killed in a road accident as they were reaching Barletta to reach him for a football league game. The game was subsequently postponed due to these events.

References

External links
 Mauro Marchano at BDFA.com.ar 

1980 births
Living people
Footballers from Rosario, Santa Fe
Argentine footballers
Association football forwards
S.S. Fidelis Andria 1928 players
U.S. Catanzaro 1929 players